Exposure Hill is a low hill at the southwest end of Gair Mesa, in the Mesa Range, Victoria Land, Antarctica. This topographical feature was so named by the northern party of the New Zealand Geological Survey Antarctic Expedition, 1962–63, because the west side of the hill has a noteworthy exposure of light colored sandstone. The hill lies situated on the Pennell Coast, a portion of Antarctica lying between Cape Williams and Cape Adare.

References 

Hills of Victoria Land
Pennell Coast